The Goff Farm Stone Bridge is a historic bridge in eastern Fayetteville, Arkansas. It carries Goff Farm Road (County Road 170) across an unnamed creek just north of Stonebridge Meadows Golf Club. The bridge's builder is unknown, and its design suggests it was built circa 1860, when the road it carries was a major east–west thoroughfare connecting Fayetteville and Huntsville. It is believed to be the oldest masonry bridge in the state, and is one of the state's small number of surviving 19th-century stone bridges.

The bridge was listed on the National Register of Historic Places in 2010.

See also
List of bridges documented by the Historic American Engineering Record in Arkansas
List of bridges on the National Register of Historic Places in Arkansas
National Register of Historic Places listings in Washington County, Arkansas

References

External links

Road bridges on the National Register of Historic Places in Arkansas
Bridges completed in 1860
Transportation in Washington County, Arkansas
Historic American Engineering Record in Arkansas
National Register of Historic Places in Fayetteville, Arkansas
Stone arch bridges in the United States
1860 establishments in Arkansas